Rashidian may refer to:
 Seyfollah Rashidian
 Asadollah Rashidian, an Iranian anglophile who along with his brothers, played a critical role in the 1953 overthrow of Iranian Prime Minister Mohammed Mossadegh
 Qodratollah Rashidian